Anthappuram is a 1980 Indian Malayalam film, directed by K. G. Rajasekharan and produced by B. V. K. Nair. The film stars Prem Nazir, Ambika, Jayan, Seema, Sudheer and Kaviyoor Ponnamma in the lead roles. The film has musical score by Shankar–Ganesh.

Cast
 
Prem Nazir as Vijayan 
Ambika as Usha 
Jayan as Vasu 
Sudheer as Susheelan 
Kaviyoor Ponnamma as Bhavani 
Adoor Bhasi as Nair 
Jose Prakash as Sekhara Pillai 
Anandavally 
Baby Vandana 
Bindulekha
Jagannatha Varma as Balakrishna Pillai 
Justin
Kamal Roy as Child Artist 
Master Suresh
Nellikode Bhaskaran as Asan 
Seema as Meenu 
Vanchiyoor Radha 
Manavalan Joseph as Policeman 
Thodupuzha Radhakrishnan as Inspector

Soundtrack
The music was composed by Shankar–Ganesh and the lyrics were written by Mankombu Gopalakrishnan.

References

External links

see the film
 anthapuram

1980 films
1980s Malayalam-language films
Films scored by Shankar–Ganesh
Films directed by K. G. Rajasekharan